Yandovishche is a rural locality in Mashkinsky Selsoviet Rural Settlement, Konyshyovsky District, Kursk Oblast, Russia. Population:

Geography 
The village is located on the Lipovy Kolodez Brook (a tributary of the Belichka in the basin of the Svapa River), 67 km from the Russia–Ukraine border, 65 km north-west of Kursk, 18 km north-east of the district center – the urban-type settlement Konyshyovka, 5.5 km from the selsoviet center – Mashkino.

 Climate
Yandovishche has a warm-summer humid continental climate (Dfb in the Köppen climate classification).

Transport 
Yandovishche is located 58.5 km from the federal route  Ukraine Highway, 33.5 km from the route  Crimea Highway, 26 km from the route  (Trosna – M3 highway), 9.5 km from the road of regional importance  (Fatezh – Dmitriyev), 4 km from the road  (Konyshyovka – Zhigayevo – 38K-038), on the road of intermunicipal significance  (38K-005 – Marmyzhi – Mashkino), 8 km from the nearest railway station Sokovninka (railway line Navlya – Lgov-Kiyevsky).

The rural locality is situated 70 km from Kursk Vostochny Airport, 172 km from Belgorod International Airport and 268 km from Voronezh Peter the Great Airport.

References

Notes

Sources

Rural localities in Konyshyovsky District